W26CE, UHF analog channel 26, was a low-power television station licensed to New York, New York, United States. The station was owned by Atlantic Coast Communications. W26CE's transmitter was located in Manorville, New York. The station was most recently airing color bars.

History

W26CE signed on as W19CF on channel 19 on September 1, 1987. It was owned by Fordham University's WFUV. After the September 11 attacks knocked out WNBC's terrestrial transmission equipment, W26CE was one of three UHF stations (the others being WLIW and WMBC-TV) that temporarily carried WNBC's over-the-air signal until WNBC was able to resume terrestrial transmissions from a transmitter in West Orange, New Jersey. W26CE was later sold to current owner Atlantic Coast Communications. After the sale was finalized, the audio format was taken off the air. The station was then on the air with a test pattern without audio being played to fulfill Federal Communications Commission (FCC) requirements from time to time. W26CE was not required to transition to digital broadcasting in 2009 as it was not a full-power television station.

The FCC canceled W26CE's license on August 4, 2021, due to the station failing to obtain a license for digital operation by the July 13 deadline.

References

Mineola, New York
26CE
Television channels and stations established in 2001
2001 establishments in New York (state)
Defunct television stations in the United States
Television channels and stations disestablished in 2021
2021 disestablishments in New York (state)
26CE